The City Council of Madrid is the top-tier administrative and governing body of the Madrid, the capital and biggest city of Spain.

The City Council is composed by three bodies; the Mayor who leads the City Council and the executive branch of it, the Governing Council (Junta de Gobierno) which is the main body of the executive branch composed by the Mayor and the councillors appointed by him and the Plenary, a democratically elected assembly which represents the people of Madrid. The current Mayor of Madrid is José Luis Martínez-Almeida since June 2019.

Main bodies

Governing Council 
The Junta de Gobierno of the City of Madrid is the executive branch of the City Council, formed by the Mayor and a group of councillors appointed by the Mayor. The current Board is composed of ten members, which are:

Districts 
The local government of the City uses a decentralized system but ultimately led by the ayuntamiento. The Plenary is the body with authority to divide the City into districts and the Mayor has the authority to appoint the "Councillor-Presidents" chairing those districts. A Councillor-President must be an elected councillor. The current officeholders are:

Plenary

The Plenary is the body of maximum political representation of citizens in the municipal government, exercises the powers that are expressly assigned to it and is made up of the Mayor and the councillors. The councillors are elected on the basis of universal suffrage in a secret ballot, and in turn they determine the Mayor of Madrid. Plenary sessions are public. The Plenary can operate in Committees, which will be formed by the Councillors who designate the political groups in proportion to their representation in the Plenary.

The Plenary (Pleno del Ayuntamiento de Madrid) is the body formed by the elected councillors. The passing of by-laws, annual budget and taxes; the scrutiny of the council of government and the motion of no confidence on the Mayor are tasks assigned to this entity in Spain.

The Plenary of the City Council of Madrid is formed by the following groups for the period 2019-2023:

Mayor

The current mayor is José Luis Martínez-Almeida, from People's Party, invested on 15 June 2019 by an absolute majority of the Plenary (30 councillors) in a secret ballot among the councillors.

Elections 
A list of elections since the restoration of the democratic system is presented as follows:
 1979 Madrid City Council election
 1983 Madrid City Council election
 1987 Madrid City Council election
 1991 Madrid City Council election
 1995 Madrid City Council election
 1999 Madrid City Council election
 2003 Madrid City Council election
 2007 Madrid City Council election
 2011 Madrid City Council election
 2015 Madrid City Council election
 2019 Madrid City Council election

Councillors 

 List of Madrid councillors (2003–2007)
 List of Madrid councillors (2007–2011)
 List of Madrid councillors (2011–2015)
 List of Madrid councillors (2015–2019)
 List of Madrid councillors (2019–2023)

City Hall

The City Hall is located at the Cybele Palace (Plaza de Cibeles, Retiro District), formerly known as Palacio de Comunicaciones. The City Council began the process of moving from the Casa de la Villa (the former City Hall) to the Palacio de Comunicaciones in 2007.

Municipal companies 
The ayuntamiento, an entity with full legal personality, fully owns the following municipal companies: Madrid Destino, EMT Madrid, EMVS Madrid and the mortuary. It also has a participation in Mercamadrid, Madrid Calle 30 and the Club de Campo Villa de Madrid.

References

Further reading 
 Comunidad de Madrid: 
 España:

Links 

Government of Madrid
Madrid